The seventh season of the stop-motion television series Robot Chicken began airing in the United States on Cartoon Network's late night programming block, Adult Swim on April 6, 2014, with the episode DC Comics Special II: Villains in Paradise and contained a total of 20 episodes. The first of the regular season 7 episodes aired on April 13, 2014.

Episodes

References 

2014 American television seasons
Robot Chicken seasons